Milingimbi Island, also Yurruwi, is the largest island of the Crocodile Islands group off the coast of Arnhem Land, Northern Territory, Australia.

Location

History
Aboriginal people have occupied the area for more than 40,000 years. It was an important ritual centre for the great ceremonies conducted by the indigenous inhabitants. In 1923, the Methodist Overseas Mission established a mission on the island, which attracted Aboriginal people from eastern clan groups. They included Gupapuyŋu- and Djambarrpuyŋu-, as well as Wangurri- and Warramirri-speaking people. The Yan-nhangu-speaking Yolngu people are the traditional owners of Milingimbi and its surrounding seas and islands.

The island was bombed by the Japanese during World War II and most of its population moved to nearby Elcho Island. After the war, the island continued to be used as a Royal Australian Air Force base, before the missionaries returned in 1951. The mission administered the island until 1974, after which management was transferred to Milingimbi Community Incorporated. In 2008 Milingimbi, became part of the East Arnhem Regional Council, which took over local government.

Language
English is a second, third or fourth language for most Aboriginal residents of Milingimbi. A successful bilingual program of the Milingimbi CEC, started in 1974, was stopped. Bilingual education continues on some of the surrounding outstations, run by traditional owners concerned to support the linguistic, cultural and biological diversity of the Crocodile Islands. To that end, the Yan-nhangu traditional owners have started the volunteer Crocodile Islands Rangers project to promote sustainable livelihood activities for local people in local languages.

Facilities
The island has its own airfield, Milingimbi Airport, with the airport call-sign YMGB, and is also the site of a Bureau of Meteorology weather station. The island also has its own ALPA (Arnhem Land Progress Aboriginal Corporation) store, post office and an art gallery. Milingimbi has a community library serviced by East Arnhem Regional Council.

Notable people
 Binyinyuwuy Djarrankuykuy was a leading Aboriginal artist from the island of Milingimbi. His works are held in major museums around the world.
 Tom Djäwa, an artist and community leader and elder, was part of recordings that appeared on the Voyager Golden Record, along with Mudpo and Waliparu.
 Artist David Malangi attended school at Milingimbi in his childhood.
 According to one account, the noted didgeridoo maker and player, Djalu Gurruwiwi, was born at Milingimbi.
 Northern Territory senior Australian of the Year 2012, Laurie Baymarrwangga, was the senior djungaya (manager) of Milingimbi Island. She was awarded the 2011 Northern Territory Innovation and Research Award for her projects, including the development of a Yan-nhaŋu Dictionary (1994-2012) and her work with the Crocodile Islands Rangers. In 1935, Baymarrwangga was photographed by Donald Thomson at Milingimbi and at Murrungga.
 Danzal Baker (known professionally as 'Baker Boy') is an influential music artist hailing from Milingimbi

Citations

Sources

External links

 Milingimbi as part of East Arnhem Shire Council
 Crocodile Islands Rangers project
 Milingimbi Island map

1923 establishments in Australia
Arnhem Land
Islands of the Northern Territory
Aboriginal communities in the Northern Territory